Kurt Magnus (March 28, 1887 – June 20, 1962) was a German lawyer and politician, best known as a pioneer in establishing radio broadcasting in Germany.

He was born to Ernest and Louise Magnus in Kassel.

He was the first president (1951-1962) of the Goethe-Institut.

The   established by ARD in his name is given to young radio professionals since 1963.

Decorations
Iron Cross, 2nd and 1st classes
Knight's Cross of the House Order of Hohenzollern
1952: Grand Cross of the Order of Merit of the Federal Republic of Germany
1957: Grand Cross with star of the Order of Merit of the Federal Republic of Germany

References

1887 births
1962 deaths
German lawyers
Radio pioneers
Political office-holders in Hesse
People associated with the Goethe-Institut
Recipients of the Iron Cross (1914), 1st class
Recipients of the Iron Cross (1914), 2nd class
Oranienburg concentration camp prisoners